Tonje Kjærgaard born June 11, 1975, is a former Danish team handball player, World champion, two times European champion and two times Olympic champion. She won a gold medal with the Danish national team at the 1996 Summer Olympics in Atlanta. Four years later she won a gold medal with the Danish national team at the 2000 Summer Olympics in Sydney.

References

1975 births
Living people
Danish female handball players
Olympic gold medalists for Denmark
Handball players at the 1996 Summer Olympics
Handball players at the 2000 Summer Olympics
Olympic medalists in handball
Medalists at the 2000 Summer Olympics
Medalists at the 1996 Summer Olympics